Zave is a village in the province of Mashonaland West, Zimbabwe. It is located about 7 km north of Lion's Den and is the terminus of a railway branch line.

Populated places in Mashonaland West Province